Jessica Rizzo is an Italian pornographic actress, stage actress, and entrepreneur.

Life and career
Rizzo began her career as a singer, often performing with her husband Marco Toto on guitar.

In 1989, the couple starred in the pornographic film Giochi bestiali in famiglia. They had already starred in some amateur pornography with their faces covered by masks. The 1989 film created a stir in their hometown, drawing the attention of Italian press and launching Rizzo's career.

Rizzo went on to appear in numerous pornographic films, including films with Gerard Damiano.

She founded the company Jessica Rizzo Communications, which produces amateur videos. She works as both a director and performer for her company. She also has her own line of lingerie and perfume.

Rizzo also works as a stage actress, having made her theatrical debut in 1995 in Dario D'Ambrosi Il nulla. In 2003, she was directed by Arnolfo Petri in Albert Camus' Caligula.

In 2011, Rizzo and Toto were involved in a case of tax evasion for allegedly evading approximately 16 million Euros.

References

External links
 
 

Living people
Italian pornographic film actresses
Italian stage actresses
People from Fabriano
1965 births